Partridge v Crittenden [1968] 1 WLR 1204 is an English case, which was heard by the Divisional Court of the Queen's Bench Division of the High Court of England and Wales on appeal from Chester magistrates' court, and is well known (amongst other cases) for establishing the legal precedent in English contract law that advertisements are usually considered to be invitations to treat.

Facts
This case was a case stated by the magistrates' court sitting at the Castle in Chester on 19 July 1967.

On 13 April 1967 an advertisement by the appellant (Arthur Robert Partridge) appeared in the periodical "Cage and Aviary Birds", under the general heading "Classified Advertisements" which contained, amongst others, the words "Quality British A.B.C.R. ... Bramblefinch cocks, Bramblefinch hens 25 s. each". In no place was there any direct use of the words "offer for sale". A Thomas Shaw Thompson wrote to Partridge asking him to send him an ABCR ("aviary bred, close ringed") bramblefinch hen and enclosed a cheque for 30s. On 1 May 1967, Partridge dispatched a brambling, which was wearing a closed ring around its leg, to Thompson in a box. Thompson received the box and was able to remove the ring from the bird's leg without injuring it.

Partridge was charged by Anthony Ian Crittenden, on behalf of the RSPCA, with illegally offering for sale a live wild bird which was not a close-ringed specimen, bred in captivity, contrary to s. 6(1) and Sch. 4 of the Protection of Birds Act 1954. The magistrates decided that the advertisement was an offer for sale and that the bramblefinch hen was not a close-ringed specimen bred in captivity, because it was possible to remove the ring from the bird's leg.

Partridge was convicted, was fined £5 and ordered to pay £5 5s advocate's fee and £4 9s. 6d. witnesses' expenses.

Partridge appealed against conviction.

Relevant law
Section 6(1) of the Protection of Birds Act 1954 states:

Schedule 4 of the Act has the heading "Wild birds which may not be sold alive unless close-ringed and bred in captivity" and amongst the names in the schedule is "brambling".

Judgment
The High Court had to answer whether the appellant's advertisement constituted a legitimate offer for sale (as the prosecution chose to prosecute only for the weaker of the three possible alleged facts), and whether the bird was not a close-ringed specimen bred in captivity under the Protection of Birds Act 1954 if it were possible to remove the ring from its leg. It was held that the advertisement in question constituted in law an invitation to treat and not an offer to sell; therefore the offence with which the appellant was charged was not established. The judges also said that if the only issue were whether the bird was a close-ringed specimen under the Protection of Birds Act 1954, the magistrates' judgment would have been upheld. Ashworth J gave his judgment first.

Lord Parker CJ said the following.

Blain J concurred.

References

See also
 Contract
 Offer and acceptance
 Invitation to treat
 Carlill v Carbolic Smoke Ball Company
 Pharmaceutical Society of Great Britain v Boots Cash Chemists (Southern) Ltd

High Court of Justice cases
1968 in the environment
1968 in British law
English agreement case law
1968 in case law